is a Japanese anime director and artist. Primarily working alongside director Koichi Mashimo at Bee Train animation studio, he's come on scene in his work with some notable productions by Bee Train including the anime adaption of Clamp's Tsubasa Chronicle and the third segment Field Test in Batman: Gotham Knight.

Filmography

Director

Hyouge Mono: Episode Director
 Hanasaku Iroha: Episode Director
 Psychic Detective Yakumo: Episode Director
 Phantom ~Requiem for the Phantom~: Episode Director
 Blade of the Immortal: Episode Director
 Batman: Gotham Knight Segment Field Test
 El Cazador de la Bruja: Episode Director
 Tsubasa Chronicle: Co-General Director for season 2 and Episode Director for both seasons
 Spider Riders: Episode Director
 Madlax: Episode Director
 Meine Liebe: Episode Director
 Metabots: Episode Director
 Avenger
 .hack//Liminality: Episode Director for Volume 3
 .hack//SIGN: Episode director
 Bakusou Kyoudai Let's & Go: Episode Director

Assistant and Unit Director

 Tsubasa Chronicle: Assistant Director
  Avenger: Unit Director
 .hack//Legend of the Twilight: Unit Director
 .hack//SIGN: Unit Director
 You're Under Arrest! : Unit Director

Storyboard Artist
Hyouge Mono
 Psychic Detective Yakumo
 Phantom ~Requiem for the Phantom~
 Blade of the Immortal
 Murder Princess
 Tsubasa Chronicle
 IGPX: Immortal Grand Prix
 Scrapped Princess
 Madlax
 Immortal Grand Prix
 NieA under 7

Animation Director
 Batman: Gotham Knight Segment Field Test
 IGPX: Immortal Grand Prix

Sound Department
You're Under Arrest!: Voice director

References

 Katoh, Hidekazu et al. "Tsubasa - Reservoir Chronicle". (May 2007) Newtype USA. pp. 26–33.

External links
 
 

Bee Train Production
Anime directors
Living people
Japanese storyboard artists
Japanese voice directors
Year of birth missing (living people)